Lady Harrington is a 1926 French silent film directed by Hewitt Claypoole Grantham-Hayes and Fred LeRoy Granville and starring Claude France, Maurice de Féraudy and Warwick Ward. It is based on a novel  by Maurice Level.

Cast
 Claude France as Lady Harrington 
 Maurice de Féraudy as Bréhaut  
 Warwick Ward as Comte de Jaugé  
 Joë Hamman as James Barker  
 Charley Sov as Marquis de Forteville  
 Francine Mussey as Catherine Bréhaut  
 André Dubosc as Plessis-Renaud  
 Jean-François Martial as Foulard, dit le Fox 
 Choura Barrach 
 Nathalie Greuze as Laura Boggioli  
 Jacques Henley as Rivalta  
 Raymond de Sarka

References

Bibliography
 Goble, Alan. The Complete Index to Literary Sources in Film. Walter de Gruyter, 1999.

External links

1926 films
French silent feature films
1920s French-language films
Films based on French novels
French black-and-white films
1920s French films